The NME Album of the Year and Single Of The Year were announced on 1 December 2009. It was the 36th countdown of the most popular albums and tracks of the year, as chosen by music reviewers and independent journalists who work for the magazine and for NME.com.

Albums

Bold: Album contains Song of the Year

Countries represented
 = 27
 = 19
 = 1
 = 1
 = 1
 = 1

Singles

Artists with Multiple entries

4 Entries
La Roux (8, 19, 24, 41)

2 Entries
The Big Pink (3, 22)
Jay-Z (6, 46)
Lady Gaga (9, 21)
Arctic Monkeys (11, 15)
Biffy Clyro (25, 43)
Grizzly Bear (32, 45)
Friendly Fires (34, 44)

Countries represented

 = 31
 = 17
 = 1
 = 1
 = 1

References

New Musical Express
2009 in British music
British music-related lists